Ronica Jeffrey (born January 24, 1983, Brooklyn, New York) is the International Women's Boxing Federation World Super Featherweight champion. Her professional boxing record is 17-1-1. Jeffrey is managed by Brian Cohen.

World Championship Bout with Olivia Gerula
On May 24, 2013, in the main event at Westchester County Center in White Plains, New York, Jeffrey, a former World Boxing Council Silver titleholder, won the vacant IWBF World Super Featherweight title by ten round unanimous decision over former World Boxing Council Super Featherweight Female World Champion Olivia Gerula of Winnipeg, Canada, fighting in her sixth consecutive world title bout. Scorecards were 99-91, 99-91, and 98-92 for Ronica Jeffrey.

Ronica Jeffrey emerged from the bout ranked as the BoxRec number three female featherweight boxer in the world, a significant achievement. There were no clinches, holds or fouls in the title contest refereed by Ron Lipton.

Boxing  Record

References

External links
 

1983 births
American women boxers
Boxers from New York City
Sportspeople from Brooklyn
Living people
Boxers managed by Brian Cohen
Super-bantamweight boxers
Super-featherweight boxers
21st-century American women